Kick-Ass 2 is a 2013 black comedy superhero film written and directed by Jeff Wadlow, based on the graphic novels Book Two and Book Three of Kick-Ass: The Dave Lizewski Years by Mark Millar and John Romita, Jr., and serving as a sequel to 2010's Kick-Ass. It stars Aaron Taylor-Johnson, Christopher Mintz-Plasse, Chloë Grace Moretz, and Jim Carrey, with the former trio reprising their roles from the first film. The film follows Dave Lizewski / Kick-Ass (Taylor-Johnson), who joins a vigilante team called "Justice Forever", while Mindy Macready / Hit Girl (Moretz) attempts to live a normal life, and Chris D'Amico (Mintz-Plasse) taking up the mantle of The Motherfucker and forming a supervillain team to take revenge on Kick-Ass.

Kick-Ass 2 was released on 14 August 2013 in the United Kingdom, 16 August in the United States, and 24 February 2014 in Japan by Universal Pictures for the former two, and Toho-Towa for the latter. The film earned $60.8 million on a $30 million budget. It received mixed reviews from critics, with many deeming it inferior to the first film.

Plot

Four years after the death of Damon Macready / Big Daddy and defeating Frank D'Amico, Dave Lizewski, bored after having retired from fighting crime as Kick-Ass, begins training with Hit-Girl (Mindy Macready) to become a real hero. Dave's girlfriend Katie Deauxma breaks off their relationship due to her mistakenly believing Dave to have been cheating on her with Mindy.

Following the death of his father, Chris D'Amico accidentally kills his own mother by kicking her tanning bed, causing it to short-circuit. Now in control of his father's criminal empire, Chris decides to become a supervillain named The Motherfucker, adapting a BDSM suit for his costume, and assembles a gang of supervillains called the Toxic Mega Cunts with his aide Javier, swearing vengeance on Kick-Ass. The other leading members of the Toxic Mega Cunts include African-American UFC fighter Black Death, short-stature mob enforcer The Tumor, ex-Triad gang member Genghis Carnage, and the only woman on the team, former Russian bodyguard Mother Russia.

Mindy's guardian, Marcus, discovers she is still fighting crime and makes her promise to give it up. Dave resumes his life as Kick-Ass, joining the superhero team Justice Forever (which Dave had inspired), led by ex-mafia member and born-again Christian, Colonel Stars and Stripes. Kick-Ass begins a sexual relationship with Night Bitch, a member of Justice Forever. Dave and Marty (who is also a member of Justice Forever as Battle Guy), alienate their friend Todd from participating in their heroics because Todd's superhero persona "Ass-Kicker" is an obvious knockoff of Kick-Ass. Mindy, attempting to lead a normal life, tries out for the dance team at school, and promptly asks a boy to take her on a date after declining to join Justice Forever. The date ends up as a cruel prank planned by bullies in her school, but Mindy gets her revenge the next day, resulting in her suspension from school and her grounding by Marcus when he finds out.

Dave's father discovers Dave is Kick-Ass after finding his superhero costume, and they have an argument which leads Dave to leave home. After his imprisoned uncle has Javier killed, a now-deranged Chris kills Colonel Stars and Stripes, and attempts to rape Night Bitch the following day, but fails due to impotence and has her beaten up instead. Chris's henchwoman Mother Russia kills the arriving authorities, resulting in a police clampdown on both costumed villains and vigilantes. When the police track Dave through his IP address, Dave's father surrenders, claiming that he is Kick-Ass, in Dave's place. Chris, tipped off by Todd, who has joined the Toxic Mega Cunts unaware that they are psychopaths, has Mr. Lizewski murdered in police custody, revealing his true identity.

The Toxic Mega Cunts sabotage Mr. Lizewski's funeral and kidnap Dave, but Mindy rescues him. Afterwards, Dave, Mindy and the remaining members of Justice Forever, joined by a resurgence of masked do-gooders, battle and defeat the outnumbered Toxic Mega Cunts. Mindy, as Hit-Girl, defeats and kills Mother Russia with the help of an adrenaline dose in battle, while Dave and Chris fight on a rooftop. Chris crashes through a skylight, landing in a water tank where he is mauled by a shark.

Justice Forever decides to take a break from its superhero duties, helping people in their ordinary lives instead. Mindy tells Dave that she is leaving New York due to being wanted for murder, but that the citizens need Kick-Ass. As police officers raid Marcus's home to investigate Mindy's whereabouts, Dave accepts the responsibility and begins training and upgrading his equipment, with a much more muscular physique.

In a post-credits scene, Chris, who has survived the shark attack, and whose limbs and genitals were bitten off by the shark, complains for attention over an out of reach cup of water.

Cast

Additionally, comic book creators Mark Millar and John Romita, Jr., former UFC Light Heavyweight Champion Chuck Liddell, and Aaron Taylor-Johnson's stepdaughter Angelica Jopling make cameo appearances in the film.

Production
On 8 May 2012, it was reported that a sequel to Kick-Ass (2010) would be distributed by Universal Studios, and that Matthew Vaughn had chosen Jeff Wadlow, who also wrote the script, to direct the sequel. Later that month, Aaron Taylor-Johnson and Chloë Grace Moretz entered negotiations to reprise their roles as Kick-Ass and Hit-Girl, respectively. Chad Gomez Creasey and Dara Resnik Creasey performed uncredited work on Wadlow's script to make Hit-Girl more feminine and less crass in light of Moretz's older age. In July 2012, Christopher Mintz-Plasse confirmed that he would return as Chris D'Amico who becomes the supervillain The Motherfucker. Mintz-Plasse expressed relief that a rape and child murder scene from the comic book would not be included in the film and went on to compare the gang violence in the story to the film The Warriors (1979). That same month, it was announced that John Leguizamo would play a character named Javier, one of The Motherfucker's bodyguards. In August 2012, it was reported that Donald Faison would play the superhero Doctor Gravity. Also that month, Yancy Butler was set to reprise her role as Angie D'Amico, Lyndsy Fonseca stated that she would return as Katie Deauxma in a smaller role, Robert Emms was cast as superhero Insect Man, Morris Chestnut was confirmed to replace Omari Hardwick as Hit-Girl's guardian Marcus Williams, Lindy Booth was confirmed to play Night Bitch, a superhero seeking to avenge the murder of her sister, Andy Nyman was announced to play one of the villains named The Tumor, and Claudia Lee joined the cast as Brooke, the leader of a gang of school bullies.

In September 2012, Jim Carrey was cast in the role of Colonel Stars and Stripes, the leader of superhero group Justice Forever. Also in September, Enzo Cilenti was confirmed to appear in the film. It was confirmed that bodybuilder Olga Kurkulina would portray the villainess Mother Russia. It was revealed that Clark Duke would reprise his role as Marty Eisenberg, who becomes the superhero Battle Guy, and that Augustus Prew would take over the role of Todd Haynes, who becomes the superhero Ass-Kicker, from Evan Peters. Principal photography began on 7 September 2012 in Mississauga, Ontario, Canada. Once filming in Mississauga wrapped in late September, the cast and crew continued shooting in London, England, at Ashmole Academy. Filming concluded on 23 November 2012.

Music

Release
Kick-Ass 2 was released theatrically on 14 August 2013 in the United Kingdom, 16 August in the United States, and 24 February 2014 in Japan by Universal Pictures for the former two, and Toho-Towa for the latter. It later released on DVD and Blu-ray Disc in the United States on December 17 that same year.

In the film's opening weekend, Kick-Ass 2 opened in fifth place, with $13.3 million, behind The Butler (in its first weekend), We're the Millers, Elysium, and Planes (all in their second weekends). This placed it below industry experts' expectation of around $15 million and studio higher hopes of as much as $19.8 million, in line with the first film. The film would gross $28.8 million in the United States and $32 million in other countries for a total gross of $60.8 million, much less than the first film's total of $96.1 million.

Reception
The site's critical consensus reads: "Kick-Ass 2 falls short in its attempt to emulate the original's unique blend of ultra-violence and ironic humor." On Metacritic, the film has a weighted average score of 41 out of 100 based on 35 critics, indicating "mixed or average reviews". Audiences polled by CinemaScore gave the film an average grade of "B+" on an A+ to F scale.

Mark Olsen of the Los Angeles Times said "Kick-Ass 2 is a lesser version of what it appears to be, an uncertain jumble rather than a true exploration of outrage, violence and identity." Olsen found Hit-Girl dealing with ordinary life more interesting than Kick-Ass trying to be a superhero, but feels the story is marred by bad jokes about bodily functions. He criticized Taylor-Johnson's performance as "a charisma-free zone". Manohla Dargis of The New York Times said "There isn't anything good to say about Kick-Ass 2, the even more witless, mirthless follow-up to Kick-Ass." Dargis further criticized the misogyny and the poorly delivered jokes, as well as the director's failure to grasp the terrible beauty of violent imagery. PopMatters said "Like the age old admonition that too many cooks spoil the broth, Kick-Ass 2 suffers from having too many characters and not enough time to deal with them all." Gibron wishes there had been more time to explore the supporting characters, like Mother Russia. He notes the echoes of Carrie White in the Hit-Girl high school sequences. He suggests a Hit-Girl film would be preferable to "limp, unlikable results offered [by this film]".

Justin Chang of Variety said "Kick-Ass 2 improves on its 2010 predecessor in at least one respect: It doesn't make the mistake of trying to pass off its bone-crunching brutality as something shocking or subversive." John DeFore of The Hollywood Reporter said the "Sequel offers exactly the blend of R-rated nastiness and candy-colored action fans expect."

Peter Bradshaw of The Guardian said "The sequel to 2010's punk-superhero rampage has lost quite a bit of shock value – but Chloë Grace Moretz's Hit-Girl is still the coolest thing in a cape." Owen Williams, writing for Empire magazine, notes that despite the larger cast of characters this feels like a smaller film, and calls it a "faithful adaptation of its namesake source comic" and in the absence of Mark Strong he praises Mintz-Plasse for holding his own as the villain. He calls it a "more modest success than the first Kick-Ass" and gives it 3 out of 5 stars.

Filmmaker Quentin Tarantino named the film as one of the ten best he had seen in 2013.

Accolades

Home media
Kick-Ass 2 was released on digital download on 3 December 2013, and on Blu-ray and DVD on 17 December 2013 by Universal Pictures Home Entertainment.

Jim Carrey controversy
Several months before Kick-Ass 2 was released, Jim Carrey withdrew support for the film on account of the amount of violence in it in the wake of the Sandy Hook Elementary School shooting. Carrey wrote: "I did Kick-Ass a month before Sandy Hook and now in all good conscience I cannot support that level of violence. My apologies to others involved with the film. I am not ashamed of it but recent events have caused a change in my heart."

Mark Millar replied in his official forum, saying, "Yes, the body-count is very high, but a movie called Kick-Ass 2 really has to do with what it says on the tin," and compared it to films by Quentin Tarantino, Sam Peckinpah, Chan-wook Park, and Martin Scorsese. Millar insisted the film concentrated on the consequences of violence rather than the violence itself.

Moretz also commented, "It's a movie. If you are going to believe and be affected by an action film, you shouldn't go to see Pocahontas because you are going to think you are a Disney Princess. If you are that easily swayed, you might see The Silence of the Lambs and think you are a serial killer. It's a movie and it's fake, and I've known that since I was a kid... I don't want to run around trying to kill people and cuss. If anything, these movies teach you what not to do."

Sequel and proposed follow-up projects
In April 2012, while Kick-Ass 2 was still in pre-production, Mark Millar stated that a third film was also planned. In June 2013, however, he revealed that it was not confirmed and would be dependent on how successful the second film was. Later the same month, he further elaborated that if it went ahead, the third film would be the final installment: "Kick-Ass 3 is going to be the last one... I told Universal this and they asked me, 'What does that mean?' I said, 'It means that this is where it all ends.' They said, 'Do they all die at the end?' I said, 'Maybe' – because this is a realistic superhero story... if someone doesn't have a bullet proof vest like Superman, and doesn't have Batman's millions, then eventually he is going to turn around the wrong corner and get his head kicked in or get shot in the face. So Kick-Ass needs to reflect that. There has to be something dramatic at the end; he cannot do this for the rest of his life."

Moretz has shown interest in returning for a third installment and would also be interested in exploring Hit-Girl's dark side: "I want to see something we haven't seen yet. Now we've seen who Mindy is, now we've seen who Hit-Girl is, I think we need to meld the characters together and have Mindy become Hit-Girl and Hit-Girl become Mindy. Maybe her natural hair has a streak of purple in it, maybe she really does go kind of crazy and go a bit darker since she lost her father." She also added, "I would only do the third one if it was logical. It needs to be a good script and a director, probably Matthew (Vaughn). The third film needs to fully wrap up the series and has to be a good note to end on."

On 30 August 2013, Millar stated that the film is "in the pipeline". In May 2014, while at a press junket for Godzilla, Taylor-Johnson stated he is still up for a third film but he is not contracted for it and there are no plans for one currently. In the same month, Christopher Mintz-Plasse revealed he had not heard anything but expressed doubt that a third film would happen due to the second installment's disappointing box office performance.

In June 2014, Chloë Grace Moretz echoed her co-stars' sentiments when asked about Kick-Ass 3, stating that "I hope, I wish. That'd be fun. That'd be great. I doubt it but I would love it". She also cited the second film's lower box office gross as the key obstacle to the third chapter being produced and suggested file sharing was a factor: "The hard thing is if fans want a third movie, they've got to go buy the ticket to go see the movie. It was like the second most pirated movie of the year, so if you want a movie to be made into a second, a third, a fourth and a fifth, go buy a ticket. Don't pirate it." In August 2014, Moretz reiterated her previous statements and said "sadly, I think I'm done with [Hit-Girl]". In February 2015, Matthew Vaughn spoke optimistically about a "Hit-Girl" prequel. He stated "If that happens, I'm pretty sure I can persuade Aaron and Chloe to come back and finish the story of Kick-Ass." On 17 June 2015, Vaughn stated in an answer to Yahoo that he is working on a prequel on how Hit-Girl and Big Daddy became superheroes and plans to make Kick-Ass 3 after.

In June 2018, Vaughn announced his intention to set up Marv Studios, under which banner he will produce a reboot of the Kick-Ass series.

On 16 December 2021, Vaughn revealed that a reboot is in the works and will be out in two years.

Notes

References

External links

 
 
 
 
 

2013 films
2013 action comedy films
2013 black comedy films
2010s high school films
2010s superhero comedy films
2010s teen comedy films
American action comedy films
American black comedy films
American high school films
American sequel films
American superhero films
American teen comedy films
British action comedy films
British black comedy films
British high school films
British sequel films
British teen comedy films
2010s English-language films
British films about revenge
American films about revenge
Films based on Marvel Comics
Films based on works by Mark Millar
British films set in New York City
Films shot at Pinewood Studios
Films shot in London
Films shot in Toronto
Kick-Ass (franchise)
Live-action films based on Marvel Comics
Mafia films
Casting controversies in film
Film controversies in the United States
Obscenity controversies in film
Superhero black comedy films
Teen superhero comedy films
American vigilante films
Plan B Entertainment films
Universal Pictures films
Films directed by Jeff Wadlow
Films produced by Brad Pitt
Films produced by Matthew Vaughn
Films scored by Henry Jackman
Films scored by Matthew Margeson
Cultural depictions of the Mafia
2013 comedy films
Teen action films
2010s American films
2010s British films